Percival Stockdale (1736–1811) was an English poet, writer and reformer, active especially in opposing slavery.

Biography
Born 26 October 1736 (O. S.) at Branxton, Northumberland, he was the only child of Thomas Stockdale, vicar of the parish and perpetual curate of Cornhill-on-Tweed, and his wife, Dorothy Collingwood of Murton, Northumberland. After spending six years at Alnwick grammar school, he went in 1751 to the grammar school at Berwick-upon-Tweed. He became acquainted with the Greek and Latin classics, and acquired a taste for poetry.

In 1754 Stockdale entered the University of Aberdeen, with a bursary for the united colleges of St. Leonard and St. Salvador. The death of his father in 1755 left the family with money troubles, and he accepted the offer of a lieutenancy in the Royal Welsh Fusiliers. He joined Admiral John Byng 's fleet, which anchored in the Bay of Gibraltar in May 1756. Stockdale, with part of his regiment, was on board HMS Revenge, in the expedition sent, under the command of Byng and Temple West, to the relief of the besieged garrison of St. Philip on Menorca. He returned to England in October 1756, and in November 1757 he left the army with the pretext of poor health.

Introduced to Thomas Sharp (1693–1758), archdeacon of Northumberland, Stockdale was persuaded to take holy orders. At Michaelmas 1759 he was ordained deacon by Richard Trevor, bishop of Durham. Immediately afterwards he went to London as Sharp's substitute in the curacy and lectureship of Duke's Place, near Aldgate. He mixed with London literati, meeting David Garrick, Samuel Johnson, Sir William Browne, Oliver Goldsmith, John Hawkesworth, and Lord Lyttelton. In 1767, having no church employment, he visited Italy, and resided for two years at Villafranca, where he read and wrote. He returned to London in 1769.

Stockdale succeeded William Guthrie in editing The Critical Review, and edited the Universal Magazine in 1771. Lord Sandwich, First Lord of the Admiralty, appointed him chaplain of HMS Resolution, a guardship lying at Spithead; he was attached to the vessel for three years. In 1779 he contributed to the Public Advertiser political letters under the signature of "Agricola". According to his own account, he missed out on the work that became Samuel Johnson's Lives of the Poets (1779–81).

After a brief time as tutor to the eldest son of Lord Craven, Stockdale was presented in 1780 by Sir Adam Gordon to the rectory of Hinxworth, Hertfordshire; while there he took priest's orders. In 1783 Lord-chancellor Thurlow presented him to the vicarage of Lesbury, Northumberland, and to this the Duke of Northumberland added the vicarage of Long Houghton, in the same county. On 28 October 1784 Archbishop John Moore conferred on him the Lambeth degree of M.A.

After paying a visit to Tangier for the sake of his health, Stockdale returned to Lesbury in 1790. His reaction to the Haitian Revolution of 1792 put him among the radical abolitionists. With William Roscoe, he defended the violence with which slaves liberated themselves.

Stockdale died at Lesbury on 14 September 1811, and was buried at Cornhill-on-Tweed.

Works
Stockdale's major work was The Poet (1773), a poem. He wrote also:

A Poetical Address to the Supreme Being (Berwick [1764]),The Constituents: a poem, London, 1765
 A translation of Torquato Tasso's Amyntas, 1770Life of Edmund Waller, prefixed to the poet's Works, 1772Antiquities of Greece, translation from the Latin of Lambert Bos, 1772Three Discourses: two against Luxury and Dissipation, one on Universal Benevolence, 1773Institutions, Manners, and Customs of the Ancient Nations, translation of François Sabbathier, Les Mœurs, coutumes et usages des anciens peuples (3 vols. 1770–1)Six Discourses, to which is prefixed an introduction containing a view of the genuine Ancient Philosophy, London, 1777An Enquiry into the Nature and Genuine Laws of Poetry; including a particular defence of the Writings and Genius of Mr. Pope, 1778, against An Essay on the Writings and Genius of Pope (1756, 1782)  by Joseph Warton. Miscellanies in Prose and Verse, 1778Letters from Lord Rivers to Sir C. Cardigan, 1778, translation from Marie Jeanne Riccoboni An Examination of the Important Question whether Education at a Great School or by Private Tuition is preferable, London, 1782. The second part is an answer to Liberal Education, or a Practical Treatise on the Methods of acquiring Useful and Polite Learning (1781) by Vicesimus Knox.Essay on Misanthropy, 1783Sermons on Important and Interesting Subjects, 1784Ximenes, verse tragedy in five acts, not acted, 1788Thirteen Sermons to Seamen, preached on board H.M.S. Leander in the Bay of Gibraltar, 1791Letter to Granville Sharp, suggested by the present Insurrection of the Negroes in the Island of St. Domingo, 1791. A defence of the St. Domingue Slave Revolt.Observations on the Writings and Conduct of our present Political and Religious Reformers, 1792Poetical Thoughts and Views on the Banks of the Wear, 1792Letter to Mr. Bryant, occasioned by his late Remarks on Mr. Pope's Universal Prayer, 1793
Edition of James Thomson's Seasons, with biography, 1793Letter to a Gentleman of the Philanthropic Society on the Liberty of the Press, 1794The Invincible Island: a poem, with introductory Observations on the present War, 1797Letters between the Honourable and Right Reverend Shute, by Divine Providence, Lord Bishop of Durham ... and Percival Stockdale, 1798A Discourse on the Duties and Advantages of Old Age, Alnwick, 1801A Remonstrance against Inhumanity to Animals, and particularly against the Savage Practice of Bull-Baiting, Alnwick, 1802Verses on the abolition of the slave trade, 1804Lectures on the truly eminent English Poets, 1807Poems, a selection, 1808Memoirs of his Life and Writings, containing many interesting Anecdotes of the Illustrious Men with whom he was connected, 2 vols. 1809.A letter from Percival Stockdale to Granville Sharp, Esq., suggested to the authour by the present insurrection of the Negroes in the island of St. Domingo. , 1811

Stockdale famously eulogized Samuel Johnson's cat Hodge in his An Elegy on a Friend's Favourite Cat. The poem appeared in the Universal Magazine for May 1771.

References
Howard D. Weinbrot, Samuel Johnson, Percival Stockdale, and Brick-Bats from Grubstreet: Some Later Response to the "Lives of the Poets", Huntington Library Quarterly Vol. 56, No. 2 (Spring, 1993), pp. 105–134. Published by: University of Pennsylvania Press. DOI: 10.2307/3817589 Stable URL: https://www.jstor.org/stable/3817589

Notes

External linksVerses on the Abolition of the Slave Trade'', annotated e-text
The memoirs of the life, and writings of Percival Stockdale, Volume 1 By Percival Stockdale
 The memoirs of the life, and writings of Percival Stockdale, Volume 2 by Percival Stockdale
The Poet – a Poem by Percival Stockdale
Works of Percival Stockdale at the Internet Archive
Biography of Stockdale in The Gentleman's Magazine, Volume 110, 1811

Attribution

English abolitionists
18th-century English poets
1736 births
1811 deaths
English male poets
18th-century English male writers